The Salón de la Fama y Museo del Béisbol Venezolano (in English, the Venezuelan Baseball Hall of Fame and Museum) is a nonprofit institution operated by private interests, which was founded on April 18, 2002, thanks to the vision of Carlos Daniel Cárdenas Lares. The institution is located at Centro Sambil, in Valencia, the capital city of Carabobo State and the third largest city of Venezuela.

The museum offers visitors the origins and growth of baseball in the world and the history of what is known as the National sport of Venezuela. It also shows, through its exhibitions, the most prominent players who have made significant achievements, as well as efforts to honor people who have highlighted the activity of baseball in Venezuela, recognizing and appreciating their impact on national culture and exalt those who have made outstanding contributions to the sport.

The museum covers a total area of 2,300 square meters and is laid out on two levels. The first floor of the museum includes four historical rooms, an auditorium dedicated to Luis Aparicio, an art gallery named after Andrés Galarraga, a baseball library and a shop. On the second floor are a permanent Hall of  Fame exhibition, two batting cages, and a newsroom.

Since its opening in 2002, the museum created two nominating committees responsible for selecting the most notable baseball figures of all time. The Contemporary Committee, comprising representatives of the media, official scorekeepers, umpires, representatives of the Venezuelan Professional Baseball League, and Players Association officers, have the task of choosing both natives and foreign players who developed their careers in Venezuelan professional baseball through the 1980–2012 period. Meanwhile, the Historical Committee selects those players who made their careers in the period prior to the 1980–1981 season of the VPBL. In both cases, are also recognized those managers, executives, broadcasters and individuals who have collaborated in the development of baseball in Venezuela.

Members
Notes
Bold denotes Major League Baseball player
Italics denotes National Baseball Hall of Fame and Museum member
 Elected by Contemporary Committee † 
 Elected by Historical Committee ‡
 Elected by Special Committee ↔
 In 2004 there was no selection

2003

2005

2006

2007

2008

2009

2010

2011

2012

2014

2015

2016

2017

2018

2019

2021

See also
Baseball awards#Venezuela

References

Awards established in 2003
Baseball in Venezuela
Baseball museums and halls of fame
Buildings and structures in Carabobo
Lists of baseball players
Museums established in 2003
Museums in Venezuela
Sports organizations established in 2003
Tourist attractions in Carabobo
Halls of fame in Venezuela
2003 establishments in Venezuela